Frog & Friends (Kikker & Vriendjes) is a 2009-2010 Dutch animated TV series about Frog and his friends based on the work of Max Velthuijs. 26 episodes were produced.

Synopsis 
Frog is the hero of the show. He lives in a colourful landscape with his friends Pig, Hare, Duck and Rat.  Their animated world reflects the same simple joys as Velthuijs' books.

The characters deal with elementary feelings such as love, fear, sadness, insecurity, happiness and more. These themes are materialized by simple and clear stories. Frog and his friends try to understand the feelings they encounter in both good and bad times.

Characters

Main characters 
 Frog is the main character. He is kind, honest, open and curious. He knows no inhibition and he is a true explorer.
 Duck is playful, pretty and cheerful. Well-meaning but a little unknowing. Duck can be caring and sweet and she can make Frog laugh the most. Frog and her are best friends and like each other.
 Pig is a kind of no-nonsense "Mother Earth", always busy working in the garden, picking apples and preparing food in the kitchen.
 Hare is the protector, the character who has a sense of responsibility. He might not say a lot but when he does, the others listen.
 Rat is a wonderful jack of all trades. He is a free-spirit, free-thinker, optimistic and carefree. Rat has travelled the world and his wisdom comes through this world-experience.

Secondary characters 
 Little Bear is a bear that Frog found in the forest, he and Frog are best friends.
 Fox - He appears in Frog and the hungry fox, he wants to eat Duck.

Cast
 Frog: Jamai Loman
 Pig: Lotte Lohr
 Rat: Levi van Kampen
 Hare: Rop Verheijen
 Duck: Daphne Groot
 Little Bear: Machiel Verbeek
 Narrator: Sander de Heer

Episode titles 
 Frog in Love
 Frog Sleeps Over
 Frog and the Stranger
 Frog and the Birdsong
 Frog Plays Hide-and-Seek
 Frog Finds a Friend
 Frog and the Snowman
 Frog is Sad
 Frog is Impatient
 Frog and the Wide World
 Frog and the Hot Day
 Frog and the Treasure
 Frog in Winter
 Frog Plays Musical Chairs
 Frog is Frog
 Frog is Quiet
 Frog is Mad
 Frog is Frightened
 Frog is Bored
 Frog is a Hero
 Frog and the New Year
 Frog and a Very Special Day
 Frog and the Hungry Fox
 Frog and the Water
 Frog's Birthday Game
 Frog and the Wind

DVD Releases 
In Australia, Magna Home Entertainment have released the following Frog & Friends DVD's:
05/05/10 - Friendship: 6 Episodes
05/05/10 - Games & Adventures: 7 Episodes
29/09/10 - Feelings & Emotions: 7 Episodes
01/12/10 - Nature: 6 Episodes

International broadcast 
 Korean: EBS

References

External links 
 Frog & Friends
 Telescreen

2009 Dutch television series debuts
2010 Dutch television series endings
Dutch children's television series